Tarantula is a Portuguese power metal band established in 1981, and ranked as one of the first power metal bands. Active ever since, Tarantula has played many concerts throughout Europe with a larger emphasis in Portugal and Germany. The current members of the band are Jorge Marques (vocals), Paulo Barros (guitar), José Aguiar (bass) and Luís Barros (drums).

Members
Jorge Marques (vocals) - Jorge is the singer of Tarantula since 1989. He is also a painter and a plastic artist. His first band was the Portuguese thrash metal band Web.

Paulo Barros (guitars) - Paulo is a Portuguese guitarist and one of the founders of the band. As a solo artist Paulo has played in the 1980s and 1990s in several European countries. 

Luís Barros (drums) - Luis along with his brother Paulo Barros is one of the founding members of the band. Luís is also a producer and a recording engineer and has been is in charge of recording, mixing and producing many of the bands records since their inception. Luís owns and runs the recording studio Rec'n'Roll where many relatively successful metal and rock bands have recorded. 

José Aguiar (bass) - José is the bass player of Tarantula since 1994. Before Tarantula he was a member of the Portuguese rock band Roxigénio.

Discography

Studio albums 
 1987: Tarantula
 1990: Kingdom of Lusitania
 1993: III
 1995: Freedom’s Call
 1998: Light Beyond the Dark
 2000: Dream Maker
 2005: Metalmorphosis
 2010: Spiral of Fear
 2021: Thunder Tunes From Lusitania

Tributes 
 2001: 20 Anos de Tarantula – Tributo

Paulo Barros discography

Studio albums 
 1997: Vintage
 2003: Gemini
 2007: K:arma 7
 2015: 4
 2018: More Humanity Please

References

External links
Tarantula at AFM Records website
Apache2 Debian Default Page: It works at official Tarantula website (the home page plays an mp3 file automatically)
Tarantula article at MusicMight

Portuguese heavy metal musical groups
Musical groups established in 1981
Power metal musical groups